The 6th Micronesian Games were held on Saipan, Northern Mariana Islands from June 23-July 2, 2006. The Games featured competition in 15 different sports/disciplines.

In February 2006, the Games were canceled by the Governor of the Northern Marianas, Benigno R. Fitial, due to a financial crisis and a lack of planning. However, after pleas from athletes, coaches and parents, and the creation of a financial plan, the Games were allowed to go on.

On June 23, 2006, the games were officially opened by the Governor of the Northern Mariana Islands, Benigno R. Fitial. The torch lighter was swimmer Xenavee Torwal.

Participating countries

Sports
Slow Pitch Softball was withdrawn.

Athletics
Baseball
Basketball
Beach Volleyball
Fast Pitch Softball
Golf
Micro All Around
Spearfishing
Swimming
Table Tennis
Tennis
Triathlon
Va'a Canoe
Volleyball
Wrestling

Overall medal standings

References

External links
Official site
Results
 2006 Micronesian Games webpage

2006 in multi-sport events
2006 in Northern Mariana Islands sports
2006
2006 in Oceanian sport
International sports competitions hosted by the Northern Mariana Islands
June 2006 sports events in Oceania
July 2006 sports events in Oceania